Base 26 may refer to:

 A numeral system, see 
 Xi'an Satellite Control Center, a Chinese aerospace facility